Bruno Martinato (born 8 May 1935) is a Luxembourgian racing cyclist. He rode in the 1962 Tour de France.

References

1935 births
Living people
Luxembourgian male cyclists
Place of birth missing (living people)